In Greek mythology, Melisseus (Ancient Greek: Μελισσεύς means 'bee-man' or 'honey-man'), the father of the nymphs Adrasteia, Ida and Althaea who were nurses of the infant Zeus on Crete. His parentage differs from telling to telling, ranging from Gaia and Uranus, to Karystos the eponym of Karystos, and Socus and Combe.

Mythology 
Melisseus was the eldest and leader of the nine Kuretes of Crete. They were chthonic daimones of Mount Ida, who clashed their spears and shields to drown out the wails of infant Zeus, whom they received from the Great Goddess, Rhea, his mother. The infant-god was hidden from his cannibal father and was raised in the  cave that was sacred to the Goddess (Da) celebrated by the Kuretes, whose name it bore and still bears. The names of the two daughters of Melisseus, one called the "inevitable" (Adrasteia) and the other simply "goddess" (Ida, de) are names used for the Great Mother Rhea herself. 

The Dionysiaca of Nonnus, learned and accurate in spite of its late date, elaborates and gives all nine names of the Kuretes.

The infant god was fed on milk and honey, the milk of the goat-nymph Amaltheia. Melisseus is simply another form of Melissus, also a Cretan "honey-man," remembered by later mythographers as a "king of Crete." Fermented honey, an entheogen that was the gift of the Goddess, preceded the knowledge of wine in Aegean culture. These honey-kings consorting with the Goddess will have combined their position of authority with a sacral role, but modern interpreters would not follow Robert Graves in asserting that Melliseus "Adrasteia and Io's reputed father, is really their mother, Melissa—the goddess as Queen-bee, who annually killed her male consort." 

When he came to maturity, Zeus rewarded his nymph nurses with the horn of Amaltheia, the cornucopia or horn of plenty that is always full of food and drink. Callimachus' Hymn to Zeus, full of witty and learned detail on the god's infancy, is at pains to show by etymologies that the mythic figures and geographical features obtained their names, and thus their very identities, through their participation in Zeus' early life. Other poets concur. A less Olympian-minded culture might have suggested that the horn was not actually Zeus' to give, and that it belonged already to the ancient and fertile Minoan-Mycenean nymphs of Crete.

In a mythic fragment that explains the connection of early Cretan culture with the island of Rhodes as deriving from Crete, Diodorus Siculus briefly relates that five of the Kuretes sailed from Crete to the Chersonnese (peninsula) opposite Rhodes, with a notable expedition, expelled the Carians who dwelt there, and settling down in the land divided it into five parts, each of them founding a city, which he named after himself. Triopas, one of the sons of Helios and Rhodos herself, who was a fugitive because of the murder of his brother Tenages, fled there and was purified of the murder by Melisseus.

Notes

References
Apollodorus, The Library with an English Translation by Sir James George Frazer, F.B.A., F.R.S. in 2 Volumes, Cambridge, MA, Harvard University Press; London, William Heinemann Ltd. 1921. ISBN 0-674-99135-4. Online version at the Perseus Digital Library. Greek text available from the same website.
Carl A.P. Ruck and Danny Staples, The World of Classical Myth
Diodorus Siculus, The Library of History translated by Charles Henry Oldfather. Twelve volumes. Loeb Classical Library. Cambridge, Massachusetts: Harvard University Press; London: William Heinemann, Ltd. 1989. Vol. 3. Books 4.59–8. Online version at Bill Thayer's Web Site
Diodorus Siculus, Bibliotheca Historica. Vol 1-2. Immanel Bekker. Ludwig Dindorf. Friedrich Vogel. in aedibus B. G. Teubneri. Leipzig. 1888-1890. Greek text available at the Perseus Digital Library.
Graves, Robert, The Greek Myths, (1955) 7.1.
Graves, Robert, The Greek Myths: The Complete and Definitive Edition. Penguin Books Limited. 2017. 
Kerényi, Carl, The Gods of the Greeks, Thames and Hudson, London, 1951.
Nonnus of Panopolis, Dionysiaca translated by William Henry Denham Rouse (1863-1950), from the Loeb Classical Library, Cambridge, MA, Harvard University Press, 1940.  Online version at the Topos Text Project.
Nonnus of Panopolis, Dionysiaca. 3 Vols. W.H.D. Rouse. Cambridge, MA., Harvard University Press; London, William Heinemann, Ltd. 1940-1942. Greek text available at the Perseus Digital Library.

External links 
Melisseus and the Kuretes

Kings of Crete
Kings in Greek mythology
Cretan characters in Greek mythology
Daimons
Chthonic beings